Operation Bloodstone was a covert operation whereby the Central Intelligence Agency (CIA) sought out Nazis and collaborators living in Soviet-controlled areas, to work undercover for U.S. intelligence inside of the Soviet Union, Latin America, and Canada, as well as domestically within the United States. Many of those who were hired as part of Bloodstone were high-ranking Nazi intelligence agents who had committed war crimes.

History 
Operation Bloodstone was initially proposed by the U.S. State Department, and was approved by SANACC (the State, Army, Navy, Air Force Coordinating Committee) on June 10, 1948. In the initial stages of the operation, a brief paper identified these anti-Communist elements in non-Western hemisphere countries outside of the Soviet orbit who "have shown extreme fortitude in the face of the Communist menace" and have "demonstrated the know-how to counter Communist propaganda and techniques to obtain control of mass movements." Operation Bloodstone sought to tap these individuals who were "immobilized" on account of lack of funds and a coordinated international movement. In July, SANACC expanded the operation to:
comprise those activities against the enemy which are conducted by Allied or friendly forces behind enemy lines ... [to] include psychological warfare, subversion, sabotage, and miscellaneous operations such as assassination, target capture and rescue of Allied airmen.By 1976, Operation Bloodstone was no longer a closely guarded secret but an investigation revealed that two other highly classified programs were connected to it: Operation Paperclip and Alsos Mission.

See also
 Klaus Barbie
 Operation Paperclip
 Operation Rusty
 Ratlines (World War II)
 U.S. intelligence involvement with German and Japanese war criminals after World War II

References

CIA activities in Russia and Europe
Covert operations
Central Intelligence Agency controversies